Stadion Pahoman is a football stadium which is also sometimes used for athletics in Bandar Lampung, Lampung, Indonesia. The stadium has a capacity of 15,000, which opened in 1977.

Stadium condition

References

Football venues in Indonesia
Sport in Lampung